The 2003 Marshall Thundering Herd football team represented Marshall University in the 2003 NCAA Division I-A football season. Marshall did not make a bowl game for the first time since 1997. The Thundering Herd's upset against sixth-ranked Kansas State highlighted the  season.

Schedule

Game summaries

Kansas State

Graham Gochneaur won a matchup of backup quarterbacks to give Marshall its first victory over a ranked BCS opponent.

Marshall's Butchie Wallace rambles 45 yards in the first quarter.

"Nobody can ever take this away from me -- the No. 6 team in the nation", Gochneaur said after throwing two touchdown passes in a 27–20 upset of Kansas State (No. 6 ESPN/USA Today, No. 6 AP).

But Gochneaur, who threw the winning 3-yard touchdown pass to Jason Rader and added a 2-point conversion with just over 3 minutes left, had plenty of help from his teammates.

The Thundering Herd, known more for passing than for running or defense, rushed for 210 yards, forced four turnovers and made two goal-line stands in breaking Kansas State's 41-game home nonconference winning streak.

Gochneaur, making his second start in relief of the injured Stan Hill, was 16-for-24 for 106 yards with one interception.

Kansas State's Jeff Schwinn, another backup making his second start, was 14-for-26 for 241 yards, but also fumbled twice and threw an interception.

Hill has a sprained left knee, and Kansas State quarterback Ell Roberson has an injured left wrist. Roberson could have played, coach Bill Snyder said, but the Wildcats did not want to risk him in a nonconference game.

Kansas State had one last chance to force overtime, when Schwinn's 33-yard pass to Darren Sproles gave the Wildcats a first down at the Marshall 3 with 25 seconds left. The Wildcats were unable to get past the 2, though, and Schwinn's throw to Davin Dennis fell incomplete in the end zone as time ran out.

The Thundering Herd got 112 yards rushing from Franklin Wallace and another 83 from Earl Charles.

"I think they underestimated us, but we didn't have any doubt", Wallace said. "You can't just throw the ball and not run it."

And after giving up an average of almost 203 yards rushing in their first three games, the Herd held the Wildcats to 127 yards.

They also held Sproles—who was averaging almost 120 yards on the ground—to 77 yards on 14 carries and stuffed Schwinn on fourth-and-2 from the 3 on Kansas State's first drive of the second half.

Schwinn had 21 carries—far more than he or Snyder had envisioned—for 32 yards.

Sproles scored on a 12-yard run with 8:22 left to put Kansas State up 20–19, after Marshall punter Klint Rose muffed a snap and Kevin Huntley recovered at the Herd 44.

But Chris Royal returned the kickoff 31 yards to the Marshall 40. Ten plays later, Gochneaur threw the winner to Rader and added a 2-point conversion pass to Josh Davis.

Kansas State's last drive came after Marshall's Nick Kelly missed a 45-yard field-goal attempt with 1:27 to go.

Schwinn ran for a 1-yard touchdown that put Kansas State up 7–0 but undid his early success with fumbles that led to two touchdowns by the Thundering Herd.

Bobby Jordan intercepted Gochneaur's pass on the first play after Schwinn's touchdown keeper, and Schwinn's 22-yard pass to Jermaine Moreira gave the Wildcats first-and-goal at the 10.

But on second-and-goal from the 9, Schwinn pitched the ball straight to defensive end Johnathan Goddard, who returned it 84 yards for a 7–7 tie.

"It's heartbreaking", Kansas State center Nick Leckey said. "It's just so frustrating, because you're right there -- and then mistakes happen."

After Joe Rheem's 42-yard field goal put Kansas State up 10–7, Schwinn fumbled as he was sacked by Jamus Martin. Reggie Hayes recovered at the Marshall 45, and the Herd converted with Gochneaur's 9-yard touchdown pass to Darius Watts for a 13–10 lead.

After Ben Lewis missed the conversion, Martin recovered Meier's fumble at Kansas State 40 and Kelly's field goal put Marshall up 16–10 at the half.

Team players drafted in the NFL
The following players were selected in the 2004 NFL Draft.

References

Marshall
Marshall Thundering Herd football seasons
Marshall Thundering Herd football